is a passenger railway station located in the city of Iruma, Saitama, Japan, operated by East Japan Railway Company (JR East).

Lines
The station is 20.5 kilometers from the official starting point of the line at Hachiōji.

Station layout
The station consists of two opposed side platforms serving two tracks, which form a passing loop on the single-track line. The platforms are connected to the station building by a footbridge and the station is staffed.

Platforms

History

The station opened on 10 December 1931 in the former village of Kaneko. With the privatization of Japanese National Railways (JNR) on 1 April 1987, the station came under the control of JR East.

The southern section of the Hachikō Line between Hachiōji and Komagawa was electrified on 16 March 1996, with through services commencing between Hachiōji and Kawagoe.

From September 2014, the wooden station building was replaced by a temporary structure while a new station building was built. The new station structure was brought into use from 8 February 2015.

Passenger statistics
In fiscal 2019, the station was used by an average of 2029 passengers daily (boarding passengers only). The passenger figures for previous years are as shown below.

Surrounding area
 Surugadai University
 Iruma City Hall - Kaneko branch office
Kaneko Elementary School
Kaneko Middle School

See also
 List of railway stations in Japan

References

External links

 JR East station information 

Railway stations in Saitama Prefecture
Stations of East Japan Railway Company
Hachikō Line
Railway stations in Japan opened in 1931
Iruma, Saitama